Buess is a Swiss surname. Notable people with the surname include:

 Alex Buess (born 1954), Swiss musician
 Daniel Buess (1976–2016), Swiss musician and sound artist
 Remo Buess (born 1977), Swiss football player
 Roman Buess (born 1992), Swiss football player

Surnames of Swiss origin